Jet Li is a Chinese actor, producer, martial artist, and retired Wushu champion. His first non-Chinese film role was as a villain in the 1998 buddy cop action film Lethal Weapon 4 with Mel Gibson and Danny Glover. His first leading role in a Hollywood film was as Han Sing in the 2000 martial arts action film Romeo Must Die with Aaliyah. He has gone on to star in other international action films, including the Luc Besson-produced French films Kiss of the Dragon (2001) and Unleashed (2005). He co-starred in The One (2001) and War (2007) with Jason Statham, The Forbidden Kingdom (2008) with Jackie Chan, all three of The Expendables films with Sylvester Stallone (2010-2014), and as the title character villain in The Mummy: Tomb of the Dragon Emperor (2008). In 2020, he portrayed The Emperor of China in the live-action fantasy drama Disney film Mulan.

Filmography

Documentaries

Music videos

Video games

References

External links
 
 
 Jet Li at Hong Kong Cinemagic

 
Male actor filmographies
Chinese filmographies